Makase Nyaphisi was a Basotho diplomat and until 2012 the ambassador of Lesotho to Germany, Austria, France, Poland, Monaco, the Holy See, and Russian Federation, presenting his credentials to Russian President Dmitry Medvedev on 5 February 2010. He was succeeded in 2013 by Matlotliso Lineo Lydia Khechane-Ntoane.

References

Living people
Lesotho diplomats
Ambassadors of Lesotho to Austria
Ambassadors of Lesotho to Germany
Ambassadors of Lesotho to Russia
Ambassadors of Lesotho to Poland
Ambassadors of Lesotho to Monaco
Ambassadors of Lesotho to the Holy See
Ambassadors of Lesotho to Ukraine
Year of birth missing (living people)